Sewad Bari or Sewad Badi is a small village in the Sikar district of Rajasthan, India. It is situated south of the neighbouring village of Vijaipura and north-west of Sewad Chhoti. Sewad Bari had a population of 3,326 in 2011.Sewad Bari village has higher literacy rate compared to Rajasthan. In 2011, literacy rate of Sewad Bari village was 72.23 % compared to 66.11 % of Rajasthan. In Sewad Bari Male literacy stands at 82.19 % while female literacy rate was 61.94 %. This village is administrated by Sarpanch(head of village) who is elected representative of people.

References

Villages in Sikar district